The 1944–45 League of Ireland was the 24th season of senior football in the Republic of Ireland. Shelbourne were the defending champions.

Changes from 1943–44 
St James's Gate failed to be re-elected and were replaced by Brideville, who returned after a one-year absence.

Teams

Season overview
Cork United won their fourth title in five years.

Table

Results

Top goalscorers 

Ireland
Lea
League of Ireland seasons